This article lists agricultural universities (AUs) in India, by state or territory. Although a number of Indian universities offer agricultural education, the Indian Council of Agricultural Research (ICAR), the main regulator of agricultural education, recognizes three "Central Agricultural Universities", four Deemed Universities and 63 "State Agricultural Universities", .

Universities by state
The state with the most agricultural universities in India is Uttar Pradesh with seven universities (one deemed, one central and five state universities). There are no agricultural universities in Arunachal Pradesh, Goa, Meghalaya, Mizoram, Nagaland, Sikkim or Tripura, nor on any of the union territories, except Delhi and Jammu and Kashmir.

Andhra Pradesh
Acharya N. G. Ranga Agricultural University, Guntur
Dr. Y.S.R. Horticultural University, Venkataramannagudem, Tadepalligudem
Sri Venkateswara Veterinary University, Tirupati

Assam 
 Assam Agricultural University, Jorhat

Bihar 
 Bihar Agricultural University, Bhagalpur
 Bihar Animal Sciences University, Patna
 Dr. Rajendra Prasad Central Agriculture University, Samastipur

Chhattisgarh 
 Chhattisgarh Kamdhenu Vishwavidyalaya, Durg
 Indira Gandhi Krishi Vishwavidyalaya, Raipur

Delhi
 Indian Agricultural Research Institute

Gujarat 
 Anand Agricultural University, Anand
 Junagadh Agricultural University, Junagadh
 Kamdhenu University, Gandhinagar
 Navsari Agricultural University, Navsari
 Sardarkrushinagar Dantiwada Agricultural University, Banaskantha

Haryana 
 Chaudhary Charan Singh Haryana Agricultural University, Hisar
 Lala Lajpat Rai University of Veterinary and Animal Sciences, Hisar
 Maharana Pratap Horticultural University, Karnal
 National Dairy Research Institute, Karnal

Himachal Pradesh 
 Chaudhary Sarwan Kumar Himachal Pradesh Krishi Vishvavidyalaya, Palampur
 Dr. Yashwant Singh Parmar University of Horticulture and Forestry, Solan

Jammu and Kashmir 
 Sher-e-Kashmir University of Agricultural Sciences and Technology of Jammu, Jammu
 Sher-e-Kashmir University of Agricultural Sciences and Technology of Kashmir, Srinagar

Jharkhand 
 Birsa Agricultural University, Kanke

Karnataka 

 Karnataka Veterinary, Animal and Fisheries Sciences University, Bidar
 University of Agricultural and Horticultural Sciences, Shimoga
 University of Agricultural Sciences, Bangalore
 University of Agricultural Sciences, Dharwad
 University of Agricultural Sciences, Raichur
 University of Horticultural Sciences, Bagalkot

Kerala 
 Kerala Agricultural University, Vellanikkara, Thrissur
 Kerala University of Fisheries and Ocean Studies, Kochi
 Kerala Veterinary and Animal Sciences University, Wayanad

Madhya Pradesh 
 Jawaharlal Nehru Krishi Vishwa Vidyalaya, Jabalpur
 Nanaji Deshmukh Veterinary Science University, Jabalpur
 Rajmata Vijayaraje Scindia Krishi Vishwa Vidyalaya, Gwalior

Maharashtra 
 Central Institute of Fisheries Education, Mumbai
 Dr. Balasaheb Sawant Konkan Krishi Vidyapeeth, Dapoli
 Dr. Panjabrao Deshmukh Krishi Vidyapeeth, Akola
 Maharashtra Animal and Fishery Sciences University, Nagpur
 Mahatma Phule Krishi Vidyapeeth, Rahuri
 Vasantrao Naik Marathwada Krishi Vidyapeeth, Parbhani

Manipur 
 Central Agricultural University, Imphal

Odisha 
 Odisha University of Agriculture and Technology, Bhubaneswar

Punjab 
 Guru Angad Dev Veterinary and Animal Sciences University, Ludhiana
 Punjab Agricultural University, Ludhiana

Rajasthan 
 Agriculture University, Jodhpur, Jodhpur
 Agriculture University, Kota, Kota
 Maharana Pratap University of Agriculture and Technology, Udaipur
 Rajasthan University of Veterinary and Animal Sciences, Bikaner
 Sri Karan Narendra Agriculture University, Jobner
 Swami Keshwanand Rajasthan Agricultural University, Bikaner

Tamil Nadu 
 Tamil Nadu Agricultural University, Coimbatore
 Tamil Nadu Fisheries University, Nagapattinam
 Tamil Nadu Veterinary and Animal Sciences University, Madhavaram, Chennai

Telangana 
 P.V. Narasimha Rao Telangana Veterinary University, Hyderabad
 Professor Jayashankar Telangana State Agricultural University, Hyderabad
 Sri Konda Laxman Telangana State Horticultural University, Hyderabad

Uttar Pradesh 
 Banda University of Agriculture and Technology, Banda
 Chandra Shekhar Azad University of Agriculture and Technology, Kanpur
 Indian Veterinary Research Institute, Bareilly
 Narendra Deva University of Agriculture and Technology, Faizabad
 Rani Lakshmi Bai Central Agricultural University, Jhansi
 Sardar Vallabhbhai Patel University of Agriculture and Technology, Meerut
 Sam Higginbottom University of Agriculture Technology and Sciences
 U.P. Pt. Deen Dayal Upadhyay Pashu Chikitsa Vigyan Vishwavidyalaya Evam Go-Ansundhan Sansthan, Mathura

Uttarakhand 
 G. B. Pant University of Agriculture and Technology, Pantnagar
 Veer Chandra Singh Garhwali Uttarakhand University of Horticulture & Forestry, Pauri Garhwal

West Bengal 
 Bidhan Chandra Krishi Viswavidyalaya, Mohanpur
 Uttar Banga Krishi Viswavidyalaya, Cooch Behar
 West Bengal University of Animal and Fishery Sciences, Kolkata

See also 
 Agricultural Universities (India)
 List of agricultural universities and colleges
 List of forestry universities and colleges
 List of universities in India

Notes

References 

 
India
Agricultural universities in India